Questron II a 1988 role-playing video game published by Strategic Simulations  for the Apple II, Apple IIGS, Atari ST, Commodore 64, IBM PC, and Amiga. It is the sequel to 1984's Questron. The story and original design is credited to Quest Software (John and Charles Dougherty), the programming and artwork is credited to Westwood Associates.

Plot

The player's character has been sent back in time to defeat six Mad Sorcerers before they can create the Book of Magic featured in the original game.

Reception
Questron II outsold its predecessor by about 16,000 copies. Scorpia described the game as very similar to, but not as good as, the original. Questron II was reviewed in 1988 in Dragon #138 by Hartley, Patricia, and Kirk Lesser in "The Role of Computers" column. The reviewers gave the game 4 out of 5 stars.

Phantasie I, Phantasie III, and Questron II were later re-released together, and reviewed in 1994 in Dragon #203 by Sandy Petersen in the "Eye of the Monitor" column. Petersen gave the compilation 2 out of 5 stars.

Legacy
Chuck and John Dougherty also created some similar games that were not direct sequels to Questron.

 Legacy of the Ancients
 The Legend of Blacksilver

References

External links

Questron II at Atari Mania
Questron II at the Amiga Hall of Light
Review in Antic
Review in Info
Review in RUN magazine

1988 video games
Amiga games
Apple II games
Apple IIGS games
Atari ST games
Commodore 64 games
DOS games
Role-playing video games
Single-player video games
Strategic Simulations games
Video game sequels
Video games developed in the United States
Westwood Studios games